Phitsanulok may refer to one of five places/things in the country of Thailand:
the city Phitsanulok
Phitsanulok Province
Mueang Phitsanulok district
Monthon Phitsanulok, a former administrative entity
Phitsanulok College